The following is a list of European Boxing Union champions. The European Boxing Union (EBU) is a professional boxing governing body that sanctions championship bouts in Europe.

Heavyweight
Last update: 11 March 2023

Cruiserweight
Last update: 23 February 2021

Light-heavyweight
Last update: 23 February 2021

Super-middleweight
Last update: 29 May 2022

Middleweight
Last update: 23 February 2021

Super-welterweight
Last update: 23 February 2021

Welterweight
Last update: 23 February 2021

Super-lightweight
Last update: 23 February 2021

Lightweight
Last update: 23 February 2021

Super-featherweight
Last update: 23 February 2021

Featherweight
Last update: 13 August 2021

Super-bantamweight
Last update: 23 February 2021

Bantamweight
Last update: 23 February 2021

|-align=center
|align=left | Alessio Lorusso
|| 14 October 2022 || 0
|align=left |  Italian
|}

Flyweight
Last update: 23 February 2021

See also

European Boxing Union
List of European Boxing Union female champions

References

External links
European Boxing Union official website

Lists of boxing champions